André Filipe Magalhães Ribeiro Ferreira (born 29 May 1996) is a Portuguese professional footballer who plays for Spanish club Granada CF as a goalkeeper.

Club career

Benfica
Born in Vila Nova de Gaia, Porto District, Ferreira finished his development at S.L. Benfica after being signed from local club União Nogueirense F.C. at the age of 16. He made his professional debut with the former's reserves on 24 November 2015 in a 2–1 home win against Clube Oriental de Lisboa in the LigaPro, and finished his first season with a further five league games.

Ferreira played 34 matches in the 2016–17 campaign, helping the B team to the fourth position in the second division. On 1 July 2017, he joined fellow league club Leixões S.C. on a season-long loan, going on make 35 competitive appearances during his spell at the Estádio do Mar.

On 31 August 2018, Ferreira renewed his contract with Benfica until 2023 and was immediately loaned to C.D. Aves. He made his Primeira Liga debut on 27 October, in a 1–2 home loss to C.D. Santa Clara.

Santa Clara
On 28 June 2019, Ferreira cut ties with Benfica and signed a four-year deal with Santa Clara also of the Portuguese top tier. During his spell in the Azores, he played second-fiddle to Marco Pereira.

Paços Ferreira
Ferreira joined F.C. Paços de Ferreira on 23 June 2021, agreeing to a three-year contract. He was in goal in both legs of the UEFA Europa Conference League's play-off round against Tottenham Hotspur, keeping a clean sheet in the first match.

Ferreira took part in 37 official games at the Estádio da Mata Real.

Granada
On 20 July 2022, Ferreira became the third Portuguese goalkeeper in as many years at Granada CF – recently relegated to the Spanish Segunda División – after Rui Silva and Luís Maximiano, signing a two-year deal.

References

External links

1996 births
Living people
Sportspeople from Vila Nova de Gaia
Portuguese footballers
Association football goalkeepers
Primeira Liga players
Liga Portugal 2 players
Boavista F.C. players
S.L. Benfica B players
Leixões S.C. players
C.D. Aves players
C.D. Santa Clara players
F.C. Paços de Ferreira players
Segunda División players
Granada CF footballers
Portugal youth international footballers
Portuguese expatriate footballers
Expatriate footballers in Spain
Portuguese expatriate sportspeople in Spain